The Knickerbocker Club (known informally as The Knick) is a gentlemen's club in New York City that was founded in 1871. It is considered to be the most exclusive club in the United States and one of the most aristocratic gentlemen's clubs in the world.

The term "Knickerbocker", partly due to writer Washington Irving's use of the pen name Diedrich Knickerbocker, was a byword for a New York patrician, comparable to a "Boston Brahmin".

History 

The Knickerbocker Club was founded in 1871 by members of the Union Club of the City of New York who were concerned that the club's admission standards had fallen. By the 1950s, urban social club membership was dwindling, in large part because of the movement of wealthy families to the suburbs. In 1959, the Knickerbocker Club considered rejoining the Union Club, merging its 550 members with the Union Club's 900 men, but the plan never came to fruition.

The Knick's current clubhouse, a neo-Georgian structure at 2 East 62nd Street, was commissioned in 1913 and completed in 1915, on the site of the former mansion of Josephine Schmid, a wealthy widow. It was designed by William Adams Delano and Chester Holmes Aldrich, and it has been designated a city landmark.

Membership 

Members of the Knickerbocker Club are almost-exclusively descendants of British and Dutch aristocratic families that governed the early 1600s American Colonies or that left the Old Continent for political reasons (e.g. partisans of the Royalist coalition against Cromwell, such as the "distressed Cavaliers" of the aristocratic Virginia settlers), or current members of the international aristocracy. Towards the middle of the 20th century, however, the club opened its doors to a few descendants of the Gilded Age's prominent families, such as the Rockefellers and Stillmans.

E. Digby Baltzell explains in his book Philadelphia Gentlemen: The Making of a National Upper Class: "The circulation of elites in America and the assimilation of new men of power and influence into the upper class takes place primarily through the medium of urban clubdom. Aristocracy of birth is replaced by an aristocracy of ballot. Frederick Lewis Allen showed how this process operated in the case of the nine "Lords of Creation" who were listed in the New York Social Register as of 1905: ‘The nine men who were listed [in the Social Register] were recorded as belonging to 9.4 clubs apiece,’ wrote Allen. ‘Though only two of them, J. P. Morgan and Cornelius Vanderbilt III, belonged to the Knickerbocker Club, the citadel of Patrician families (indeed, both already belonged to old prominent families at the time), Stillman and Harriman joined these two in the membership of the almost equally fashionable Union Club; Baker joined these four in the membership of the Metropolitan Club of New York (magnificent, but easier of access to new wealth); John D. Rockefeller, William Rockefeller, and Rogers, along with Morgan and Baker were listed as members of the Union League Club (the stronghold of Republican respectability); seven of the group belonged to the New York Yacht Club. Morgan belonged to nineteen clubs in all; Vanderbilt, to fifteen; Harriman, to fourteen.’ Allen then goes on to show how the descendants of these financial giants were assimilated into the upper class: ‘By way of footnote, it may be added that although in that year [1905] only two of our ten financiers belonged to the Knickerbocker Club, in 1933 the grandsons of six of them did. The following progress is characteristic: John D. Rockefeller, Union League Club; John D. Rockefeller Jr., University Club; John D. Rockefeller 3rd, Knickerbocker Club. Thus is the American aristocracy recruited.'"

Christopher Doob wrote in his book Social Inequality and Social Stratification in U.S. Society: "Personal wealth has never been the sole basis for attaining membership in exclusive clubs. The individual and family must meet the admissions committee’s standards for values and behavior. Old money prevails over new money as the Rockefeller family experience suggests. John D. Rockefeller, the family founder and the nation’s first billionaire, joined the Union League Club, a fairly respectable but not top-level club; John D. Rockefeller Jr., belonged to the University Club, a step up from his father; and finally his son John D. Rockefeller, III, reached the pinnacle with his acceptance into the Knickerbocker Club (Baltzell 1989, 340)."

Selected notable members
 Charles Francis Adams III (1866–1954), Ambassador, great-grandson of the sixth U.S. President John Quincy Adams (1767–1848), and a great-great-grandson of the second U.S. president and Founding Father John Adams (1735–1826). Member of the prominent Adams family
 His Royal Highness Prince Amyn Aga Khan, Imam of Nizari Ismailism
 His Royal Highness Prince Sadruddin Aga Khan (1933–2003), Imam of Nizari Ismailism. Statesman and activist who served as United Nations High Commissioner for Refugees from 1966 to 1977
 Gianni Agnelli (1921–2003), principal shareholder of Fiat, and Italian Senator for life. He is the great-great-grandson of business magnat Giuseppe Francesco Agnelli (1789–1865) of the Agnelli family. Through his mother Princess Virginia Bourbon del Monte he is also a member of the Princely House of Bourbon del Monte Santa Maria
 Winthrop W. Aldrich (1885–1974), United States Ambassador to the United Kingdom and scion of the prominent political Aldrich family. Son of the influential Senator Nelson W. Aldrich (1841–1915) who was referred to by the press and public alike as the "general manager of the Nation." Descendant of John Winthrop (1587–1649)
 Baron Carlo Amato (1938–2021), Ambassador of The Sovereign Military Hospitaller Order of Saint John of Jerusalem of Rhodes and of Malta
 Chester Alan Arthur II (1864–1937), sportsman, art connoisseur, and son of U.S. President Chester A. Arthur (1829–1886). Descendant of General Uriah Stone, who served in the Continental Army during the American Revolution
 Count Alessandro Guiccioli de Asarta (1843–1922), Senator of the Kingdom of Italy and Congressman of the Kingdom of Italy
 Viscount Waldorf Astor (1879–1952), British politician and member of the House of Lords. Great-great-great-grandson of John Jacob Astor, the richest man in America at the time. Member of the prominent Astor family
 Robert Bacon (1860–1919), United States Secretary of State then U.S. Ambassador to France. Scion of the Boston Brahmin Bacon family whose members included philosopher and scientist Viscount Francis Bacon (1561–1626), U.S. Senator and Chief of Justice Ezekiel Bacon (1776–1870), and Massachusetts Congressman John Bacon (1738–1820)
 Arthur, The Earl of Balfour (1848–1930), Prime Minister of the United Kingdom, then First Lord of the Admiralty. Often associated to the Balfour Declaration, public statement issued by the British government in 1917 announcing support for the establishment of a "national home for the Jewish people" in Palestine
 His Royal Highness Prince Franz von Bayern, Duke of Bavaria, head of the House of Wittelsbach
 Count Guerin De Beaumont (1896–1955), French diplomat and active member of the Bilderberg Group. Member of the House of de Beaumont
 His Royal Highness Count Folke Bernadotte of Wisborg (1895–1948), diplomat and grandson of King of Sweden Oscar II. In World War II he negotiated the release of about 31,000 prisoners from German concentration camps. After the war, Bernadotte was unanimously chosen to be the United Nations Security Council mediator in the Arab–Israeli conflict of 1947–1948 
 Anthony Joseph Drexel Biddle Jr. (1897–1961), General and U.S. Ambassador to seven countries. Scion of the prominent Biddle family
 Francis Beverly Biddle, attorney general and Nuremberg judge (1886–1968). Scion of the prominent Biddle family
Prince Livio Borghese (1874–1939), Italian Diplomat in the Ottoman Empire and in China. Scion of the Princely Borghese House
 John Moors Cabot (1901–1981), U.S. Ambassador to five nations during the Truman, Eisenhower, and Kennedy administrations. Descendant of John Cabot (born 1680), a highly successful merchant of the prominent Boston Brahmin Cabot family
 John Lambert Cadwalader (1836–1914), United States Secretary of State. Descendant of John Cadwalader (1742–1786) (general during the American Revolutionary War, who served with George Washington) and Thomas Cadwalader (1707–1779). Member of the prominent Cadwalader family and Van Cortlandt family
 His Royal Highness Prince Alfonso, Count of Caserta (1841–1934), pretender to the throne of the Kingdom of the Two Sicilies
 Adna Chaffee (1842–1914), General and Chief of Staff of the United States Army, taking part in the American Civil War and American Indian Wars, playing a key role in the Spanish–American War, and fighting in the Boxer Rebellion in China. Descendant of Thomas Chaffee (1610–1683), businessman and landowner of the Massachusetts Colony, and scion of the Boston Brahmin Chaffee family
 William A. Chanler (1867–1934), explorer, soldier and New York politician. Descendant of  Edward Sutton, 2nd Baron Dudley (1460–1531), Member of Parliament of England, John Winthrop (1587–1649), one of the founders of the Massachusetts Bay Colony, and Peter Stuyvesant, the last Dutch Director of New Netherland from 1647 to 1664, after which it was renamed New York
 Count Ghislain Clauzel (1907–1992), French Ambassador. Descendant of Count Bertrand Clauzel (1772–1842), Marshal of France during the Napoleonic Wars
 Charles A. Coffin (1844–1926), co-founder and first president of General Electric corporation. Descendant of Tristram Coffin (1609–1681), a British aristocrat who had to flee the English Civil War and who is best known for purchasing Nantucket. Scion of the prominent Coffin family
 Calvin Coolidge (1872–1933), 30th President of the United States. During his presidency, he is known to have restored public confidence in the White House after the many scandals of his predecessor's administration. He was a direct descendant of John Coolidge (1604–1691), a member of the English landed gentry who emigrated to Massachusetts in 1630 and a member of the Boston Brahmin Coolidge family
 Duke Pierre de Cossé Brissac (1900–1993), French aristocrat and author who wrote a series of historical memoirs. Head of the House of Cossé-Brissac
 Frank Crowninshield (1872–1947), journalist, developer of Vanity Fair, scion of the Boston Brahmin Crowninshield family whose members include Massachusetts Governor John Crownshield (1649-1699) and Secretary of the Navy Benjamin Williams Crowninshield (1772-1851).
 Harvey Cushing (1869–1939), American neurosurgeon, pioneer of brain surgery who was the first exclusive neurosurgeon and the first person to describe Cushing's disease. Scion on the Cushing family whose notable members include American Founding Father Thomas Cushing III (1725–1788), William Cushing (1732–1810) nominated Court's Chief Justice by President  George Washington and English theologian Thomas Cushing (1512–1588). Direct descendant of  John Cotton (1585–1652), the great 16th century Puritan theologian
 Richard Henry Dana Jr. (1815–1882), lawyer and politician who gained renown as the author of the classic American memoir Two Years Before the Mast. Both as a writer and as a lawyer, he was a champion of the downtrodden, from seamen to fugitive slaves and freedmen. Descendant of Founding Father Francis Dana (1743–1811), and of French Huguenot Richard Dana (1620–1690) who arrived in Massachusetts during the later end of the Puritan migration to New England.
 Robert Williams Daniel, Jr. (1936–2012), member of the U.S. House of Representatives. Son of financier Robert Williams Daniel, descendant of William Randolph (prominent figure in the history and government of the English colony of Virginia) and Edmund Randolph (the seventh Governor of Virginia, the first Attorney General of the United States and later served as Secretary of State).
 Michel David-Weill, French investment banker and former Chairman of Lazard Frères, art collector. Great-great-grandson of Alexandre Weill, co-founder of Lazard Frères
 Henry A. Dudley (1913–1995), U.S. Ambassador. Member of the ancient prominent Dudley family, whose members include Lord Henry Dudley (1517–1568), Thomas Dudley (1576–1653) Founder and Governor of the Massachusetts Bay Colony and a founder of Harvard University, and Joseph Dudley (1647–1720) Colonial Administrator of the Dominion of New England
 Angier Biddle Duke (1915–1995), youngest American Ambassador in history and Chief of Protocol of the United States. Heir of the Duke Family business empire in tobacco and electric power, and major benefactor of Duke University, named after his family (one of the First Families of Virginia). Also a scion of the prominent Biddle family, and a great-great-grandson of financier Anthony Joseph Drexel who founded with J. P. Morgan the bank Drexel, Morgan & Co. (later J.P. Morgan & Co.)
 Viscount David Eccles (1904–1999), member of the House of Lords and prominent British politician who served as Minister of Education, Minister of Works, and as President of the Board of Trade
 T. S. Eliot (1888–1965), Nobel Prize-winning poet, playwright, and literary critic. Member of the aristocratic Boston Brahmin Eliot family, whose notable members include Charles William Eliot (1834–1926) the longest serving President of Harvard University, and Charles Eliot Norton (1827–1908) progressive social considered the most cultivated man in the United States by his contemporaries
 William Crowninshield Endicott (1826–1900), United States Secretary of War. Member of the prominent Endicott family, and direct descendant of John Endecott (1589–1665), one of the Fathers of New England and the longest-serving governor of the Massachusetts Bay Colony
 Marquis Ruggero Farace di Villaforesta (1909–1970), Italian Ambassador, and member of the highly aristocratic family Farace di Villaforesta, whose origins have been documented back to the aristocratic families of the Byzantine Empire, and which is directly related to figures such as Queen Natialia of Serbia or Princess Aspasia of Greece and Denmark. He was married to Princess Catherine Ivanovna of Russia, great-great-granddaughter of Tsar Nicholas I of Russia, a niece of King Alexander I of Yugoslavia, and second cousin of Prince Philip, Duke of Edinburgh
 Baron Carlo de Ferrariis Salzano (1905–1985), Italian Ambassador. Scion the Princely House of Gaetani dell'Aquila d'Aragona from his mother side and of the Princely House of Morra from his paternal grandmother
 Frederick Theodore Frelinghuysen (1817–1885), Secretary of State. Grandson of Continental Army General Frederick Frelinghuysen (general) (1753–1804) and great-great-grandson of Dutch Reformed Church minister Theodorus Jacobus Frelinghuysen (1691–1747). Member of the Frelinghuysen political dynasty
 Francis Warrington Gillet (1895–1969) was an American flying ace who served in both the American and British armed forces as a pilot during World War I. Member of the prominent Gillett family whose members include colonist Jonathan Gillett (1609–1677) and Speaker of the United States House of Representatives Frederick H. Gillett (1851–1935) 
 Ogden Goelet (1851–1897), yachtsman and heir to one of America's largest business empires at the time. Member of the prominent Goelet family, descendants of an aristocratic family of Huguenots in France who escaped from religious persecutions and arrived in New York in 1676. His daughter, Mary Goelet, married Henry Innes-Ker, 8th Duke of Roxburghe
 Baron Amaury de La Grange (1888–1953), aviator and politician
 Baron Frederick G. d’Hauteville (1838–1918), politician, member of the House of Hauteville
 Baron Paul G. d’Hauteville (1875–1947), Captain of the Red Cross, member of the House of Hauteville
 Count Florian Henckel von Donnersmarck, German film director, best known for writing and directing the 2006 Oscar-winning dramatic thriller The Lives of Others
 His Serene Highness Prince Friedrich of Hohenzollern (1924–2010), head of the Princely House of Hohenzollern for over 45 years, and scion on his mother side of the Royal House of Wettin and through his paternal grandmother of the Royal House of Bourbon-Two Sicilies
 H. B. Hollins (1854–1938), financier and railroad magnate. Prominent member of the New York patrician Hollins family
 Baron Rodolphe Hottinger, banker and member of the House of Hottinger
 Peter Augustus Jay (1877–1933), Ambassador. Great-great-great-grandson of John Jay (1745–1829), Founding Father and first United States Chief Justice. Member of the Jay family of Huguenots who had come to New York to escape religious persecution in France
 Woodbury Kane (1859–1905), a noted yachtsman and bon vivant, and member of Theodore Roosevelt's Rough Riders. Great-great-grandson of John Jacob Astor
 John Knowles (1926–2001), American novelist best known for A Separate Peace. Scion of the prominent Knowles family and direct descendant of Royal Navy Admiral Sir Charles Knowles (1754–1831)
 Amos A. Lawrence (1814–1886), key figure in the United States abolitionist movement in the years leading up to the American Civil War. Son of philanthropist Amos Lawrence (1786–1852) and scion of the Lawrence family who descend from John Lawrence (1609–1667) of England
 Robert J. Livingston (1811–1891), businessman, member of the prominent Livingston family, which descends from the 4th Lord Livingston (died 1518), and whose members include Robert Livingston the Elder (1654–1728) and signers of the United States Declaration of Independence (Philip Livingston) and the United States Constitution (William Livingston). Several members were Lords of Livingston Manor.
 His Serene Highness Prince Edouard de Lobkowicz (1926–2010), Austrian-American Ambassador and investment banker. Member of the Princely House of Lobkowicz and member of the Royal House of Bourbon-Parma
 Henry Cabot Lodge Jr. (1902–1985), United States Ambassador and prominent American politician. Scion of the patrician Lodge family, he is the grandson of Senate Majority Leader Senator Henry Cabot Lodge (1850–1924), the great-grandson of Secretary of State Frederick Theodore Frelinghuysen (1817–1885), and great-great-great-grandson of Senator George Cabot (1751–1823)
 Duke Joseph Florimond of Loubat (1831–1927), yachtsman, bibliophile, antiquarian, and philanthropist
 A. Lawrence Lowell (1856–1943), President of Harvard University. Scion of the Patrician Lowell family, whose notable members include Percival Lowell (1571–1665), minister John Lowell (1704–1767), delegate to the Congress of the Confederation John Lowell (1743–1802), Ambassador and poet James Russell Lowell (1819–1891), and mathematician and astronomer Percival Lowell (1855–1916) who led the discovery of Pluto
 Anthony Dryden Marshall (1924–2014), theatrical producer, C.I.A. intelligence officer  former ambassador. Great-great-grandson of John Fairfield Dryden (1839–1911), founder of Prudential Insurance Company and a United States Senator from 1902 to 1907. 
 Frederick Townsend Martin (1849–1914), writer and anti-poverty advocate, referred to as the "millionaire with a mission."
 Paul Mellon (1907–1999), philanthropist and an owner/breeder of thoroughbred racehorses. Co-heir to one of America's greatest business fortunes; member of the prominent Mellon family
 Baron Jean de Ménil (1904–1973), Franco-American businessman, philanthropy, and art patron
 George Minot (1885–1950), winner of the Nobel Prize in Medicine. Great-great-grandson of historian George Richards Minot (1758–1802), and cousin of Charles Sedgwick Minot (1852–1914) anatomist and a founding member of the American Society for Psychical Research. Scion of the Boston Brahmin Minot family
 Count Gebhardt von Moltke (1938–2019), Ambassador, and direct descendant of Prussian field marshal Count Helmuth von Moltke, and great-great-grandnephew of Chief of the Great German General Staff Count Helmuth von Moltke
 Marquis de Morès, Duke of Vallombrosa (1858–1896), famous duelist, railroad pioneer in Vietnam, and a politician in his native country France
 J. P. Morgan (1837–1913). banker and financier, descendant of William Morgan (1582–1649) and Miles Morgan (1616–1699). Member of the prominent Morgan family. Resigned when a friend he had sponsored for membership was blackballed and founded the Metropolitan Club of New York
 Marquis Guy-Philippe de Montebello, director of the Metropolitan Museum of Art
 Edward N. Ney (1925–2014), Ambassador. Descendant of Michel Ney, Marshal of the Empire during the Napoleonic Wars 
 Kichisaburo Nomura (1877–1964), Japanese ambassador
 Count Jehan de Noüe (1907–1999), Chief of Protocol of the United Nations. Member of the ancient aristocratic de Noüe family
 John Bertram Oakes (1913–2001), iconoclastic and influential U.S. journalist known for his early commitment to the environment, civil rights, and opposition to the Vietnam War. Great-great-great-grandson of General Sir Hildebrand Oakes (1754–1822)
 Baron Max von Oppenheim (1860–1946), archaeologist, famous for discovering the site of Tell Halaf in 1899. Member of the prominent Oppenheim family
 Charles Jackson Paine (1833–1916) railroad executive, yachtsman, and a general in the Union Army during the American Civil War. Great-great-grandson of Robert Treat Paine (1731–1814) Founding Father of the United States who signed the Continental Association and the Declaration of Independence
 The Lord Palumbo, property developer and art collector, member of the House of Lords
 Marquis Lelio Pellegrini Quarantotti (1909–1990), Italian Grand Prix motor racing driver
 Johnston Livingston de Peyster (1846–1903), colonel during the civil war, and known for running for mayor of Tivoli-on-Hudson against his father, and winning. Member of the prominent De Peyster family and Livingston family. Great-great-great-grandson of Abraham de Peyster (1657–1728), an early Mayor of New York City, whose father was Johannes de Peyster (–1685). Descendant of William Livingston, 4th Lord Livingston (died 1518)
 Wendell Phillips (1811–1884) was an American abolitionist, advocate for Native Americans, orator, and attorney. According to George Lewis Ruffin, a Black attorney, Phillips was seen by many Blacks as "the one white American wholly color-blind and free from race prejudice." Son of John Phillips (1770–1823), first mayor of Boston, and descendant of English-born Puritan minister George Phillips (1593–1644). Scion of the Boston Brahmin Phillips family, which counts among its notable members Samuel Phillips, Jr. (1752–1802), and John Phillips (1719–1795), founders of the Phillips Academy and Phillips Exeter Academy
 Henry Hepburne-Scott, 10th Lord Polwarth (1916–2005), businessman, Minister of State of Scotland
 George P. Putnam (1887–1950), American publisher, author and explorer. Husband of Amelia Earhart the first female aviator to fly solo across the Atlantic Ocean. Grandson of George Palmer Putnam (1814–1872), founder of the prominent publishing firm that became G. P. Putnam's Sons. Descendant of army general Israel Putnam (1718–1790) and English Puritan John Putnam (1580–1666)
 Edmund Quincy (1808–1877), abolitionist and editor of National Anti-Slavery Standard. Grandson of President of Harvard University Josiah Quincy III (1772–1864) and scion of the prominent Quincy family
 His Serene Highness Prince Dominik Radziwiłł (1911–1976), head of the House of Radziwiłł
 His Serene Highness Prince Anthony Radziwill (1959–1999), member of the House of Radziwiłł
 Laurence Rockefeller (1910–2004), financier, philanthropist and major conservationist.  Grandson of John D. Rockefeller, considered to be the richest person in modern history. Member of the Rockefeller family
 David Rockefeller (1915–2017), banker, chairman and chief executive of Chase Manhattan Corporation. Grandson of John D. Rockefeller, considered to be one of the richest people in modern history. Member of the Rockefeller family
 His Imperial Highness Prince Alexander Romanov (1929–2002), member of the Imperial House of Romanov
 Theodore Roosevelt Sr. (1831–1878), father of President of the United States, member of the patrician Roosevelt family He was Secretary of the Union League Club and a Founding Member of the Knickerbocker Club in 1871.
 Franklin D. Roosevelt (1882–1945), President of the United States, member of the patrician Roosevelt family—joined in 1903 upon his graduation from Harvard University. Resigned from the club in 1936.
 Viscount Paul de Rosière (1908–1995), Cartier's Chief Executive.
 Count Teofilo Guiscardo Rossi di Montelera (1902–1991), Italian bobsledder who competed in the early 1930s, and a world champion power boat racer, winning world championship in 1934, 1937, 1938, and was set to defend the Gold Cup in 1939 when war broke out. He was the heir of the aristocratic family Rossi di Montelera
 Baron Guy de Rothschild (1909–2007), owner of the Rothschild banking family of France and head of the French branch of the House of Rothschild
 Leverett Saltonstall (1892–1979), Senate Majority Leader and Minority Leader and Chair of the Senate Republican Conference. Direct descendant of Sir Richard Saltonstall (1586–1661), and member of the prominent Saltonstall family
 Baron Axel de Sambucy de Sorgue, French financier. Member of the House of Sambucy de Sorgue and a member of the Royal House of France of Bourbon-Orléans through his mother Princess Chantal d’Orléans
 John Singer Sargent (1856–1925), artist, considered the leading impressionist portrait painter of his generation. Direct descendant of Epes Sargent (1690–1762), and scion of the patrician Sargent family, whose notable members include Winthrop Sargent (1753–1820), Henry Sargent (1770–1845), or Charles Sprague Sargent (1841–1927) 
 His Imperial Highness Zera Yacob Amha Selassie, grandson of Emperor Haile Selassie and son of Amha Selassie of the Ethiopian Empire. Current head of the Imperial House of Ethiopia 
 Baron Ottavio Serena di Lapigio (1837–1914), Senator of the Kingdom of Italy, historian, and prominent figure in the Unification of Italy
 William Watts Sherman (1842–1912), businessman, member of the patrician Sherman family 
 Viscomte Henri de Sibour (1872–1938), architect
 Count Alexander von Stauffenberg (1905–1964), German aristocrat and historian. His twin brother Berthold Schenk Graf von Stauffenberg and younger brother Claus Schenk Graf von Stauffenberg were among the leaders of the 20 July plot against Hitler in 1944. Member of the Schenk von Stauffenberg family which included prominent figures such as Prussian Field marshal Count August Neidhardt von Gneisenau
 Augustus Van Horne Stuyvesant Jr. (1870–1953) New York landowner and last direct descendent of Peter Stuyvesant (1592–1672), the Dutch governor of New Netherland before it became New York. Scion of the prominent Stuyvesant family
 Baron David Swaythling (1928–1998), Member of the House of Lords and Chairman of many notable British companies, such as Rothschild & Co, Samuel Montagu & Co. or Midland Bank
 Nathaniel Thayer III (1851–1911), American banker and railroad executive. Scion of the Boston Brahmin Thayer family, and through his mother a descendant of the Dutch Aristocratic Van Rensselaer and Schuyler families
 Marquis Filippo Theodoli, Duke of Nemi (1930–1990), owner of the first high-performance luxury yachts company  Magnum Marine Corporation
 Baron Hans Heinrich Thyssen-Bornemisza (1921–2002), noted industrialist and art collector
 Count Antoine Treuille de Beaulieu (1804–1885), Army General, known for developing the concept of rifled guns in the French Army.
 Baron Léon van der Elst (1856–1933), Belgian Ambassador and one of King Albert I of Belgium's closest advisers
 Baron Georg von Ullmann (1922–1972), owner of the German Thoroughbred stud Gestüt Schlenderhan that has had a major impact on the breeding history of Thoroughbreds. Scion of the prominent Oppenheim family
 Count Mario di Valmarana (1929–2010), architect, owner of the Palladian Villa "La Rotonda"
 Pierre Van Cortlandt III (1815–1884), New York landowner. Scion of the prominent Van Cortlandt political dynasty whose members include Pierre Van Cortlandt (1721–1814), the first Lieutenant Governor of New York, and Philip Van Cortlandt (1749–1831), a founder of the hereditary Society of the Cincinnati
 Cornelius Vanderbilt III (1873–1942), general. Member of the prominent Vanderbilt family. Great-great-grandson of the railroad and shipping tycoon Cornelius Vanderbilt (“The Commodore”), one of the richest American in history. Descendant of the famous Dutch corsair Jan Janszoon (1570-1641)
 Harold Stirling Vanderbilt (1884–1970), railroad executive, yachtsman, bridge player, and a member of the prominent Vanderbilt family. Great-great-grandson of the railroad and shipping tycoon Cornelius Vanderbilt (“The Commodore”), one of the richest American in history. Descendant of the famous Dutch corsair Jan Janszoon (1570-1641)
 Alexander Van Rensselaer (1850–1933), philanthropist, and professional tennis player and champion. Member of the prominent Van Rensselaer of Dutch Aristocratic origins, whose members include Kiliaen van Rensselaer (1586–1643) one of the founders and directors of the Dutch West India Company and an instrumental figure in the establishment of New Netherland; and  Stephen Van Rensselaer III (1764–1839), Governor of New York and Grand Master of the Masonic Grand Lodge of New York and one of the richest people in history (net worth of US$3.1 billion at the time of his death—equivalent to $112.5 billion in 2021)
 Count Leonardo Vitetti (1894–1973), Permanent Representative of Italy to the United Nations
 Baron Egon von Vietinghoff-Scheel (1903–1994), German-Swiss painter, author, philosopher and creator of the Egon von Vietinghoff Foundation. He reconstructed the lost painting techniques of the Old Masters, and created some 2.700 paintings
 Craig Wadsworth (1872–1960), diplomat, steeplechase rider, and member of Theodore Roosevelt's Rough Riders. Grandson of Union general James S. Wadsworth. Scion of the prominent Wadsworth family of Connecticut, and descendant of one of the Founders of Hartford, Connecticut, William Wadsworth (1594–1675)
 James Montaudevert Waterbury Sr. (1851–1931), businessman, industrialist. Member of the prominent Livingston family, which includes the 4th Lord Livingston, and signers of the United States Declaration of Independence (Philip Livingston) and the United States Constitution (William Livingston)
 Baron Béla Ferenc Xavér Wenckheim (1811–1879), Prime Minister of Hungary 
 Henry White (1850–1927), U.S. ambassador, and one of the signers of the Treaty of Versailles.
 Robert Winthrop (1833–1892), banker, direct descendant of colonial governors John Winthrop (1587-1649), John Winthrop Jr. (1606–1676), and Fitz-John Winthrop (1637–1707).
 James T. Woodward (1837–1910), banker, avid hunter and horseman. Member of the prominent Woodward family
 Jerauld Wright (1898–1995), Commander-in-Chief of the U.S. Atlantic Command (CINCLANT) and the Commander-in-Chief of the U.S. Atlantic Fleet (CINCLANTFLT), and became the second Supreme Allied Commander Atlantic (SACLANT) for the North Atlantic Treaty Organization (NATO), from April 1, 1954, to March 1, 1960, serving longer in these three positions than anyone else in history. Son of General William M. Wright. Descendant of Senator William Wright (1794–1866) and George Mason IV (1725–1792), a Founding Father of the United States

Reciprocal clubs  

The Knickerbocker Club has mutual arrangements with the following clubs: 
 Jockey Club in Paris 
 Circolo della Caccia in Rome
 Cercle Royal du Parc in Brussels 
 Metropolitan Club in Washington D.C.
 Boodle's in London
 Brooks's in London
  in Stockholm
 Jockey Club für Österreich in Vienna
 Turf Club in Lisbon
 Nuevo Club in Madrid
  in The Hague
 Norske Selskab in Oslo
  in Paris
  in Buenos Aires
 Australian Club in Sydney
 Kildare Street & University Club in Dublin
 Società del Whist – Accademia Filarmonica in Turin
 Somerset Club in Boston
 Circolo dell'Unione in Florence
 Pacific-Union Club in San Francisco

See also
 List of gentlemen's clubs in the United States
 List of New York City Designated Landmarks in Manhattan from 59th to 110th Streets
 Metropolitan Club (Washington, D.C.)
 Cercle Royal du Parc 
 Jockey Club 
 Circolo della Caccia 
 Nya Sällskapet
 Boodle's
 Brooks's
 Haagsche Club 
 Somerset Club
 Società del Whist

References

External links
 Information about the building at TheCityReview.com

Gentlemen's clubs in New York City
Clubhouses in Manhattan
Culture of Manhattan
New York City Designated Landmarks in Manhattan
Organizations established in 1871
1871 establishments in New York (state)
Delano & Aldrich buildings
Fifth Avenue
Upper East Side
Upper class culture in New York City